Abeokuta is the capital city of Ogun State in southwest Nigeria. , Abeokuta and the surrounding area had a population of 449,088.

Geography and economy 
Abẹokuta lies in fertile country of wooded savanna, the surface of which is broken by masses of grey granite. It spreads over an extensive area, being surrounded by mud walls 18 miles in extent. Palm oil, lumber, natural rubber, yams, rice, cassava, maize, cotton, other fruits, and shea butter are the chief articles of trade. It is a key export location for cocoa, palm products, fruit, and kola nuts. Both rice and cotton were introduced by the missionaries in the 1850s and have become integral parts of the economy, along with the dye indigo.

Abeokuta lies below the Olumo Rock, home to several caves and shrines.
The town depends on the Oyan River Dam for its water supply, which is not always dependable.
The dam is situated in the Abeokuta North local government area of Ogun State in the West of Nigeria, about 20 km northwest of the state capital Abeokuta. The dam crosses the Oyan River, a tributary of the Ogun River.

Abeokuta is the headquarters of the federal Ogun-Oshun River Basin Authority, which is responsible for development of land and water resources for Lagos, Ogun, and Oyo states. Included in this are irrigation, food-processing, and electrification.

Local industries include but not limited to fruit canning plants, plastics, breweries, sawmills, and an aluminum products factory. South of town are the Aro granite quarries.

Transportation

Since 2021 there is a standard gauge railway line Lagos-Ibadan, which stops at Abeokuta. For this a new railway building has been built in Abeokuta. Trains to Ibadan leave around 8:30 and 16:30 daily, trains to Lagos around 10:00 and 18:00. Tickets can be bought at the counter and with cash only.

Roads connect it to Lagos as well as Ibadan, Ilaro, Shagamu, Iseyin, Sango Ota, and Ketou.

History 
In 1817, the Oyo Empire dissolved into civil war. Refugees displaced by the collapse of Oyo joined with the Ijebu in their war against the Owu in southern Yorubaland, which had broken out around the same time. Following the fall of Owu in around 1822, the leading Ife and Ijebu generals returned to their respective homes, but the rest of the armies that had allied with the Oyo refugees were invited by the Ijebus to Ipara, which they made their headquarters for further attacks against several towns in the region. This group then turned their attention to waging war with the Egba, a loose confederacy of towns that had been established by Yoruba migrants in the 13th century and were spread throughout the forested land between Ipara and Ibadan. The group conquered and destroyed many of these towns, eventually settling in one of the villages that had not been completely destroyed, Ibadan, which they used as their headquarters for additional conquests.

At least a handful of Egba groups had by this point joined the group of marauders, and they too were living at Ibadan. Conflict between the various groups arose, and in one incident, an Egba chief named Lamodi shot an Ife chief named Ege to death with a pistol at a public meeting before himself being killed in the ensuing commotion. Fearing Ife reprisal, most of the Egba population withdrew as a group to an encampment about 3 or 4 miles distant on the other side of the Ona River. Here they enlisted Sodeke to be their leader and migrated to a hilly area known as Olumo Rock, where they established the town of Abeokuta around 1830 at what was then a small farming village.

By 1825, Olumo Rock was already a place of refuge from Ibadan and Dahomey slave hunters; people were scattered throughout the landscape, taking shelter among the rocks surrounding the settlement. The Egba who established Abeokuta were soon joined by other Egba refugees and a substantial number of Owu who had escaped their captors. It became a busy metropolis and home to the majority of the Egba. However, the various groups of Egba did not fuse into a single community; rather, Abeokuta functioned more as a "federation of communities within a town wall than a community in its own right".

Because Abeokuta was in a key location for the palm oil trade and because it was the so-called capital of the Egbas, Dahomey soon became hostile. In the 1851 Battle of Abeokuta, the Egba defeated King Gezo and the Dahomey incursion. They again beat back the Dahomey military in 1864.

The 1860s also saw problems arise with the Europeans, namely the British in Lagos, which led to the Egba first closing trade routes, followed by the expulsion of missionaries and traders in 1867.
Between 1877 and 1893 the Yoruba Civil Wars occurred, and Abeokuta opposed Ibadan, which led the king or alake of the Egba to sign an alliance with the British governor, Sir Gilbert Carter. This occurred in 1893, which formalized the Egba United Government based in Abẹokuta which became recognized by the United Kingdom. In 1914, the Egba lands were incorporated into the colony of Nigeria by the British, with Abeokuta as the provincial capital.

In 1918, an uprising took place, the Adubi War, which was related to the levying of taxes and the policy of indirect rule by Sir Frederick Lugard, the British Governor-General. This was the only internal threat to British control of Nigeria during the course of the First World War.

The Abeokuta Women's Revolt, led by the Abeokuta Women's Union (AWU), took place in the 1940s. It was a resistance movement against the imposition of unfair taxation by the Nigerian colonial government.

In 1976, Abeokuta became the capital of the newly created Ogun State.

Notable buildings
Abeokuta was once surrounded by 18 miles of wall, and remnants of the historic wall still exist today. Ake, the traditional residence of the Alake, along with Centenary Hall (1930), are both in the Egba Alake's territory. There are secondary and primary schools and the University of Lagos Abeokuta Campus opened in 1984. This campus specializes in science, agriculture, and technology. This has since been changed to an independent full-fledged tertiary institution, Federal University of Agriculture, Abeokuta (FUNAAB) in 1988.

The Green Legacy Resort is a large resort/hotel built by former president Olusegun Obasanjo and investors. The Olusegun Obasanjo Presidential Library (OOPL) is also located within the grounds of the resort.

The Governor's office located at Oke-Mosan is also a notable building. The Federal University of Agriculture, Abeokuta (FUNAAB) located at Alabata road in Abeokuta is also one of the notable buildings in Abeokuta and one of the most beautiful public University campus in Nigeria.

Notable people 
 

 Chief Moshood Kashimawo Olawale Abiola, businessman, politician and presidential candidate.
 Chief Simeon Adebo, a Nigerian administrator, lawyer and diplomat.
Odunlade Adekola: Nollywood Actor
 Prince Bola Ajibola, former World Court judge.
 Dr. Tunde Bakare, pastor.
 Oladimeji Bankole, politician and businessman.
 Princess Sara Forbes Bonetta, Egbado princess of the Yoruba people, goddaughter of Queen Victoria.
 Jean-Marie Coquard, French Christian medical missionary
 Oba Adedotun Aremu Gbadebo III, monarch and businessman.
 Abimbola Jayeola, Nigeria first female helicopter pilot
 Fela Kuti, musician and political activist.
 Mudashiru Lawal, footballer and sports analyst.
 Shane Lawal, basketball player.
 Lijadu Sisters, identical twin sisters that were an iconic music pair in Africa between the 1960s and 1980s.
 Chief Olusegun Obasanjo, President of Nigeria from 1999 to 2007.
 Ebenezer Obey, juju musician and evangelist.
 Segun Odegbami, footballer and sports analyst.
 Akin Ogungbe, film actor, film maker, producer and director.
 Princess Kuforiji Olubi, former federal minister.
 Chief Olusegun Osoba, politician and businessman.
 Tunji Oyelana, musician, actor, folk singer and composer.
 Sir Shina Peters, musician and businessman.
 Chief Funmilayo Ransome-Kuti, women's rights activist.
 Professor Olikoye Ransome-Kuti, professor of pediatrics, former Minister of Health.
 Chief Ernest Shonekan, businessman and former head of the defunct interim government of Nigeria.
 Ike Shorunmu, footballer and coach.
 Jimi Solanke, actor, musician, storyteller and playwright.
 Professor Wole Soyinka, Nobel Prize-winning author.
 Oba Adedapo Tejuoso, monarch and businessman.
 Chief Bisoye Tejuoso, businesswoman and titled aristocrat.
 Madam Tinubu, titled aristocrat.
 Chief Akintola Williams, accountant, founder of ICAN. Oba Oyebade Lipede. Professor Jide Dasaolu
 Chief Frederick Rotimi Williams, legal scholar.

Photo gallery

References

External links

 "Abẹ́òkuta's Living History"

 
Populated places in Ogun State
State capitals in Nigeria
Cities in Yorubaland
Cities in Nigeria
1830 establishments in Africa
Populated places established in 1830